Andrzej Kudelski (born 14 February 1952 in Warsaw) is a Polish former wrestler who competed in the 1972 Summer Olympics.

References

External links
 

1952 births
Living people
Olympic wrestlers of Poland
Wrestlers at the 1972 Summer Olympics
Polish male sport wrestlers
Sportspeople from Warsaw